Albert Eldon McLean (September 20, 1912 – September 29, 1990) was a Major League Baseball pitcher.

Sources

Major League Baseball pitchers
Washington Senators (1901–1960) players
Asheville Tourists players
Louisville Colonels (minor league) players
Scranton Miners players
Albany Senators players
St. Paul Saints (AA) players
Selma Cloverleafs players
Meridian Scrappers players
Baseball players from Chicago
1912 births
1990 deaths